Laheriasarai is a city in North Bihar and considered as twin city of Darbhanga. 
It has had a long cultural history. It has long been an integral part of Mithila and has a religious significance for many Hindus.  Hindi, Maithili, and Urdu are spoken by the people of this city. Darbhanga is the district headquarters and many of its important offices are situated in Laheriasarai. It is named after a caste called Lahiri engaged in Lahathi making (Lac Bangle).Laheriasarai is the administrative Hub of Darbhanga district.

Educational institutions
 +2 M.L. Academy
BKD Govt. High School
Darbhanga Medical College
Holy Mary International School
Holy mission school
Jesus & Mary Academy Darbhanga
Laheriasarai Public School
Manas International School
M.R. Public School, Chandih
New Era Public School, Darbhanga
Rose Public School
R N M Girls High School
Safi Muslim High School
 Salfiya Unani Medical College And Hospital

Transportation
Laheriasarai Railway Station is connected to Darbhanga Railway Station and works as an important Railway Station for people living in south Darbhanga. The city is also well connected by road to Muzaffarpur, Patna, Samastipur, and other parts of Bihar. Laheriasarai Bus Stand works as an important Bus stand. For transportation across the city auto-rickshaw and rickshaw are available frequently.

External links
 Satellite Images of Laheria Sarai http://www.maplandia.com/india/bihar/darbhanga/laheria-sarai/
 Laheriasarai Railway Station at Wikimapia http://wikimapia.org/1803124/Laheriasarai-Railway-Station
 Oral Health & Anti Tobacco Awareness Campaign in Laheriasara, Darbhanga sets World Record

Cities and towns in Darbhanga district
Caravanserais in India